The Stump River is a  tributary of the Pigeon River in Minnesota, United States. It flows through the Boundary Waters Canoe Area Wilderness of Superior National Forest.

See also
List of rivers of Minnesota

References

External links
Minnesota Watersheds
USGS Hydrologic Unit Map - State of Minnesota (1974)

Rivers of Minnesota
Rivers of Cook County, Minnesota